Bisarbhora is a village development committee in Dhanusa District, Janakpur Zone, Nepal. At the time of the 1991 Nepal census, it had a population of 3,852 people living in 715 households.

References

External links
UN map of the municipalities of Dhanusa District

Populated places in Dhanusha District